The Oslo Sinfonietta is a Norwegian contemporary classical orchestra. It was founded by composer Asbjørn Schaatun in 1986. The current director and chief conductor is Christian Eggen.

The Oslo Sinfonietta grew out of contemporary music circles at the Norwegian Academy of Music. Since 1993 it has been organised as a pool of musicians comprising approximately 40 performers from the Oslo Philharmonic Orchestra, the Norwegian National Opera and Ballet Orchestra, the Norwegian Radio Orchestra and the freelance milieu. This open concept allows for a variety of instrumental combinations and choice of repertoire. Oslo Sinfonietta is meant as a forum for innovative music, showcases important works composed during this century and has commissioned and premièred a number of new works by both Norwegian and foreign composers.

It is one of the founders of the ULTIMA Oslo Contemporary Music Festival.

In 1999, the orchestra won the Spellemannprisen award for the album "Boyl" with music by Rolf Wallin.

It regularly performs in Norway and abroad, and has performed at The Casa da Música Festival in Porto, The Présence Festival in Paris and 
The Venice Biennale.

Discography 
Albums recorded by Oslo Simfonietta; often with other groups and musicians:
Rolf Wallin: Move
 John Persen: Recycles Encore/Arvesøl
Oslo Sinfonietta
 Asbjørn Schaathun: Actions, Interpolations & Analyses
 Cecilie Ore: Codex Temporis
 Åse Hedstrøm: Flow
 Rolf Wallin: Boyl
 Jon Øivind Ness: Dandy Garbage
 Magne Hegdal: Annotations
 Oslo Sinfonietta: Faces
  Eivind Buene: Objects of Desire
 Bent Sørensen:Birds and Bells
 Alfred Janson: A Bible Story

References 

Norwegian orchestras
Contemporary classical music ensembles
Sinfoniettas (orchestras)
Musical groups established in 1986
1986 establishments in Norway
Musical groups from Oslo
Spellemannprisen winners